Trickett & Webb was a London-based graphic design agency.

Lynn Trickett and Brian Webb met in 1970, whilst working at the Derek Forsyth Partnership in London. They formed the agency Trickett & Webb Limited in the following year. Their work included designs for posters, packaging, corporate identity as well as exhibition design. Their clients included a wide range of national and international clients such as British Airways, Volvo, WH Smith, Boots, London Transport, Royal Mail, Penguin Books, P&O and the BBC.

Trickett & Webb received more than 100 design awards around the world including New York Art Directors, Communication Arts USA, Packaging Design Council USA, Museum of Toyama Japan, Red Dot Germany, D&AD and Design Week and their work has been exhibited worldwide including Communicate: Independent British Graphic Design since the Sixties (Barbican Art Gallery, London 2004) and have work in the permanent collections of the V&A, MoMA and London Transport Museum.

Brian Webb formed Webb & Webb Design Limited in 2003.

References
Webb & Webb Design Limited
London Transport Museum website
V&A Museum, London, permanent collection

British graphic designers
Graphic design studios